Events from the year 1578 in Ireland.

Incumbent
Monarch: Elizabeth I

Events
 In retaliation for the Massacre of Mullaghmast, Rory Óg Ó Moore, leader of the Ó Moore clan in County Laois, burns Carlow, but is hunted down and trapped.
 The ship Emanuel, returning from Martin Frobisher's third voyage to Frobisher Bay, is wrecked at Ard na Caithne.
 Barnabe Rich publishes Alarme to England.

Births
 14 December – Joan Apsley, first wife of Richard Boyle, 1st Earl of Cork (d. 1599)

Deaths
 June – Rory Óg Ó Moore, rebel leader (killed and beheaded).

References

1570s in Ireland
Years of the 16th century in Ireland